The 2014 Austin mayoral election was held on November 4 and December 16, 2014 to elect the mayor of Austin, Texas. It saw the election of Steve Adler.

This was the first election held according to the new schedule in which elections are held every four years during the United States midterm election.

Election results

First round

Runoff

References

2014 Texas elections
2014 United States mayoral elections
2014
Non-partisan elections